George Albert Lewins  (16 July 1906 – 1991) was an English footballer who played as a full back for Rochdale, Wigan Borough and Tranmere Rovers. He was also in the reserve teams of Newcastle United, Reading and Manchester City, and played non-league football for various other clubs.

References

Rochdale A.F.C. players
Wigan Borough F.C. players
Tranmere Rovers F.C. players
Newcastle United F.C. players
Reading F.C. players
Manchester City F.C. players
Rhyl F.C. players
Walker Celtic F.C. players
Jarrow F.C. players
West Stanley F.C. players
Gateshead United F.C. players
Footballers from Newcastle upon Tyne
English footballers
1906 births
1991 deaths
Association footballers not categorized by position